Shane Daniel McLoughlin (born 1 March 1997) is an Irish professional footballer who plays as a midfielder for  club Salford City.

McLoughlin was born in New York City, where his family lived in the Bronx. He moved to Kerry, Ireland, when he was five.

He has represented Ireland at under-16 and under-18 levels.

Club career

Ipswich Town
McLoughlin joined Ipswich Town from Kerry-based club St. Brendan's Park in July 2013, signing a two-year scholarship with the side. In April 2015, the scholarship was extended for the 2015–16 season.

McLoughlin signed a one-year professional contract in July 2016 with the option of a further 12-month stay at Portman Road.

He made his Ipswich Town debut in a 2–1 EFL Cup Second Round defeat away at Crystal Palace on 22 August 2017. He started the match and was substituted for Monty Patterson in the 81st minute.

Loans to Bromley
In March 2017, McLoughlin joined National League club Bromley on loan for the rest of the season. He made seven league appearances for Bromley during this spell. McLoughlin had another brief spell on loan with Bromley the following season as he made two league appearances.

AFC Wimbledon
On 31 January 2019, McLoughlin joined AFC Wimbledon in a free transfer on an 18-month deal. He made his debut for the club 12 days later in a 1–0 win away at Walsall. He scored his first senior career goal on 9 March 2019 in a 2–0 home victory over Doncaster Rovers.

In June 2020, Wimbledon exercised the option on the midfielder's contract to keep him at the club for at least a further year. Manager Glyn Hodges praised McLoughlin upon his signing: "Shane can play in a number of positions, and he's getting better and better. He's still young and hungry to keep on improving, so we are delighted we've got him." 

McLoughlin departed the club in May 2021.

Morecambe 
On 13 July 2021, The Shrimps confirmed McLoughlin had joined for the 2021/22 season, on a one year deal.

Salford City
In January 2023, McLoughlin signed for EFL League Two team Salford City.

International career
McLoughlin has won caps for the Republic of Ireland at under-16 and under-18 levels.

Career statistics

References

External links
 Profile at the AFC Wimbledon website
 Shane McLoughlin at Soccerbase

1997 births
Living people
People from Castleisland
Republic of Ireland association footballers
Republic of Ireland youth international footballers
Association football midfielders
Ipswich Town F.C. players
Bromley F.C. players
AFC Wimbledon players
Morecambe F.C. players
Salford City F.C. players
National League (English football) players
English Football League players